Algímia d'Alfara is a municipality in the comarca of Camp de Morvedre in Valencia, Spain.

Notable people 

 Antonio Mateu Lahoz, professional football referee was born in this village.

References

Camp de Morvedre